Sweden–Uruguay relations are foreign relations between Sweden and Uruguay. Sweden has a consulate in Montevideo; the Swedish ambassador in Buenos Aires is concurrent to Uruguay.  Uruguay has an embassy in Stockholm, the ambassador being concurrent to Norway, Denmark, Finland, Latvia and Estonia.

Overview
Sweden was an important refuge for Uruguayan exiles during the civic-military dictatorship (1973-1985); there are several Uruguayans who still live in Sweden.

Currently there is a Uruguayan-Nordic Chamber of Commerce.

State visits
In October 2011, Uruguayan President José Mujica paid an official visit to Sweden.

See also 
 Uruguayans in Sweden

References

External links

 

 
Uruguay
Bilateral relations of Uruguay